David Gwynne Shepherd (October 10, 1924 – December 17, 2018) was an American producer, director, and actor noted for his innovative work in improvisational theatre. He founded and/or co-founded Playwrights Theatre Club, The Compass Players, Canadian Improv Games, and the ImprovOlympic.

Early life and education
Born in 1924 in New York City to an old money family, Shepherd grew up with left-leaning sensibilities. He was the son of Louise Tracy (Butler) and William Edgar Shepherd, an architect. His paternal grandmother was the sister of socialite Alice Claypoole Vanderbilt.

He studied English at Harvard and received an M.A. in the History of Theater at Columbia. Disenchanted with what he perceived as a European dominated theater on the East Coast, Shepherd gravitated to the Midwest.

Career

Producer and Improv innovator

Playwrights Theatre Club
In 1953 Shepherd was one of the co-founders along with Paul Sills and Eugene Troobnick of the Playwrights Theatre Club in Chicago. The theatre was noted for its original treatment of classic plays as well as original works.

Other members and participants included Elaine May, Sheldon Patinkin, Rolf Forsberg, Mike Nichols, Joyce Piven, Josephine Forsberg, Ed Asner, Barbara Harris, and many more.

The Playwright's Theatre Club led to the creation of The Compass Players and later The Second City.

Compass Players
In 1955 Shephered and Paul Sills founded The Compass Players, the forerunner of The Second City. Compass launched the careers of Mike Nichols, Elaine May, Jerry Stiller, Alan Alda, Alan Arkin, Barbara Harris, and Shelley Berman (to name a few) and started a revolution in entertainment.

Shepherd, in Mark Siska's documentary Compass Cabaret ’55, about the birth of modern improvisation, stated his reasons for founding the Compass Players, “Theater in New York was very effete and based on three-act plays and based on verbiage and there was not much action,” he said. “I wanted to create a theater that would drag people off the street and seat them not in rows but at tables and give them something to drink, which was unheard of in [American] theater.”

The Compass eventually opened in St. Louis, Philadelphia, New York, and Washington.

Community Makers
In 1971, Shepherd produced the Community Makers in New York City. Assisted by Howard Jerome Gomberg, the organization was created to correct ailing communities by using improvisation as a people’s theatre, and was housed at the Space for Innovative Development, 344 W. 36th Street, New York.

Responsive Scene radio show
In 1972, Shepherd produced the Responsive Scene radio show which aired on WRVR-FM, a public radio station owned and operated by The Riverside Church in the City of New York. Responsive Scene was an hour-long improvised show with a round-table of professional actors performing from call-in suggestions from their audience of over 40,000 listeners.

ImprovOlympic

New York
In 1973, also at the Space for Innovative Development, David went on to create the ImprovOlympic (a competitive theatrical sporting event),

The ImprovOlympic began as the Improvisation Olympics, and was founded and produced by Shepherd. His theatrical event placed competing teams of improvisers on stage in front of a live audience, and taping the performances for future replays. The format was refined by Shepherd and Gomberg and together they used the Theater Games, created earlier by Viola Spolin, as a way for teams to compete, and by 1981, Shepard moved his Improvisation Olympics back to Chicago.

Chicago
The first classes and ImprovOlympic shows took place at The Players Workshop, where Charna Halpern was a student. There, she approached Shepherd to help run his ImprovOlympics, which she did for a time, but after a difference of artistic vision, she went on to produce her own commercialized version of his creation. Halpern would later admit that, "...neither I nor the ImprovOlympic (iO) would be here if it wasn't for David Shepard."

Ottawa
Sherpherd's ImprovOlmpic was also produced in Ottawa, Canada by Jamie Wyllie and Howard Jerome to great success. The name was changed to the Canadian Improv Games (CIG) but was still based on the concept originally conceived by Shepherd.

Life-play

Shepherd resided near Amherst, Massachusetts. There, he developed a new improvisational format known as Life-Play, which consists of improvised games that can be played over the phone. According to Shepherd, If you called him at a specific number, he would provide a short training session and then introduce you to the phone team, often national participants.

Legacy
In 2010, the documentary David Shepherd: A Lifetime of Improvisational Theatre was completed. It is an oral history detailing the career of Shepherd and his contributions to Improvisational Theatre. It was directed by Mike Fly and written by Michael Golding. The documentary includes interviews with past and present associates such as Bernie Sahlins, Suzanne Shepherd, and Janet Coleman.

In 2014, Compass Cabaret 55, a documentary about the birth of modern theatrical improvisation directed by Mark Siska, also details the career of Shepherd and his contributions to Improvisational movement. Besides Shepherd, the interviewees include Bernie Sahlins, Janet Coleman, Jeffrey Sweet, and Compass veterans such as Ed Asner, Suzanne Shepherd, and Sheldon Patinkin.

Death

Shepherd died on December 17, 2018, at age 94.

Lifetime achievement awards

He received lifetime achievement awards from the Chicago Improv Festival, Second City, and the Canadian Improv Games.

References

Bibliography

Further reading

External links
Encyclopedia of Chicago History entry

1924 births
2018 deaths
Male actors from New York City
Writers from New York City
American theatre managers and producers
Harvard University alumni
Columbia University alumni